Jason 'Tornado' Twist is a four times World Champion 8-ball pool player, winning the WEPF World Rules World Championship twice, in 2000 and 2002 and also the IPA World Professional Seniors (over 40) Championship ( Blackball Rules) twice in 2015 beating Roger Demortier (France) and also 2016 beating Jeremy Hooper (Cornwall England) He lives in the North Devon coastal town of Ilfracombe, England.

He reached the final 4 times more in 1995,2003,2008 & 2015 but lost to Daz Ward, Chris Melling and Gareth Potts and Jack Whelan respectively. He has also won 3 European titles and represented the England National pool team from 1989 to 2009, winning 12 world team titles, making 16 world titles in total.

References

English pool players
Living people
Year of birth missing (living people)
World champions in pool